A lockout is a work stoppage or denial of employment initiated by the management of a company during a labour dispute. In contrast to a strike, in which employees refuse to work, a lockout is initiated by employers or industry owners. 

Lockouts are usually implemented by simply refusing to admit employees onto company premises, and may include changing locks or hiring security guards for the premises. Other implementations include a fine for showing up, or a simple refusal of clocking in on the time clock. For these reasons, lockouts are referred to as the antithesis of strikes.

Lockouts are common in major league sports, many of which operate as legalized cartels. In the United States and Canada, the National Football League, Major League Baseball, the National Basketball Association, and the National Hockey League have all experienced lockouts.

Causes 
A lockout is generally an attempt to enforce specific terms of employment upon a group of employees during a dispute. It is often used to force unionized workers to accept new conditions, such as lower wages. If the union is asking for higher wages, better benefits, or maintaining benefits, a manager may use the threat of a lockout – or an actual lockout – to convince the union to relent.

Examples 
Far from all labour disputes involve lockouts (or strikes), but lockouts have been used on a large scale around the world during and after industrialization. Some of the lockout incidents are historically significant.

Ireland 
The Dublin Lockout was a major industrial dispute between 20,000 workers and 300 employers in Dublin. The dispute lasted from 26 August 1913 to 18 January 1914, and is often viewed as the most severe and significant industrial dispute in the history of Ireland. Central to the dispute was the right to unionize.

United States 
In the United States, under federal labour law, an employer may hire only temporary replacements during a lockout. In a strike, unless it is an unfair labour practice strike, an employer may legally hire permanent replacements. Also, in many US states, employees who are locked out are eligible to receive unemployment benefits, but they are not eligible for such benefits during a strike.

For the above reasons, many American employers have historically been reluctant to impose lockouts and instead try to provoke a strike. However, as American unions have increasingly begun to resort to slowdowns rather than strikes, lockouts have become a more common tactic of many employers. Even as strikes are on the decline, lockouts are on the rise in the US.

In 1892, after several wage cuts and disputes with the employers at the Homestead Steel Mill in Homestead, Pennsylvania, the union called for a strike after the company stopped discussing its decisions with the union. Henry Clay Frick shut down the plant and locked out all workers, preventing them from entering the mill.

Recent notable lockout incidents have been reported in professional sports, notably involving Major League Baseball in the 1990 and 2021–22 offseasons, the National Basketball Association in the 1995 offseason, the 1996 offseason, and the 1998–99 and 2011–12 seasons, the National Hockey League in the 1994–95, 2004–05 and 2012–13 seasons, and the National Football League in the 2011 offseason. The controversial 2012 NFL referee lockout involved referees, not players. In 2005, the NHL became the first major professional sports league in North America to cancel an entire season due to a lockout.

In September 2016, Long Island University became the first institution of higher education to use a lockout against its faculty members.

Australia 
On 8 April 1998, stevedoring company Patrick Corporation sought to restructure its operations for productivity reasons. In an industrial watershed event, it sacked all its workers and imposed a lockout on wharves around Australia.

On 29 October 2011, Qantas declared a lockout of all domestic employees in the face of ongoing union industrial action. That cancelled all flights, grounding the entire fleet for several days.

Denmark 
On 2 April 2013, the Danish Union of Teachers and the National Union of Municipalities declared a lockout for more than 60,000 primary school teachers across the country. Over 600,000 students were also affected by the lockout and could not go to school.

The dispute was about whether teachers should have extra working time, as the Local Government Association (KL) wanted. The Danish Union of Teachers (DFL) was against it and could not find a solution. After 24 days of being locked out, the teachers lost the labour dispute on 25 April 2013, with a government intervention to end the lockout. The government chose to apply all of KL's main demands, and the teachers got a small wage increase as compensation.

Lock-in 
The term lock-in refers to the practice of physically preventing workers from leaving a workplace. In most jurisdictions, it is illegal, but it is occasionally reported, especially in some developing countries.

Lock-ins should not be confused with a sitdown strike, like the Flint sit-down strike between the United Automobile Workers and General Motors Corporation.

More recently, lock-ins have been carried out by employees against management, which have been labeled 'bossnapping' by the mainstream media. In France during March 2009, 3M's national manager was locked in his office for 24 hours by employees in a dispute over redundancies. The following month, union employees of a call center managed by Synovate in Auckland locked the front doors of the office, in response to management locking them out.  Such practices bear some resemblance to the gherao in India. It is also caused by disagreement between employer and employees in a certain department.

See also 

 Capital strike
 Dublin Lockout
 FaSinPat, an Argentine recovered factory following a lockout
 Government shutdown
 Lockout (sports)
 National Hockey League
 Strikebreaker
 Walkout

References

External links 

 Account of the great farm lockout of 1872 on EASF

Labor relations
Labor disputes
Protest tactics